Gareth Evans (born 5 August 1991) is a New Zealand rugby union player, who currently plays as a loose forward for  in New Zealand's domestic National Provincial Championship competition and the  in Super Rugby.

Early career

Born in the town of Hastings (Hawke's Bay) in the north-east of New Zealand to a Zimbabwean mother and a father from Havelock North, Evans attended Napier Boys' High School in the nearby town of Napier, where he played first XV rugby alongside future  teammates Brad Weber and Ihaia West.   After graduating high school, he moved south to Dunedin to study environmental management at the University of Otago while also playing for Dunedin in the local club rugby competition.

Senior career

2011-2013
Aged just 20, Evans broke into the  ITM Cup squad for the 2011 ITM Cup season and played all 10 games for the Razorbacks to help them to 3rd place on the Championship log, just outside of the playoff places due to the domestic season being shortened to accommodate the 2011 Rugby World Cup.

2014–2017

After three years of solid performances at domestic level for Otago, Evans earned a Super Rugby contract with the Dunedin-based  ahead of the 2014 season.  He made his Super Rugby debut on 22 February 2014 against the Blues. 
Despite strong competition from fellow loose forwards such as Shane Christie, Elliot Dixon, Nasi Manu and John Hardie, Evans acquitted himself well in his debut season of Super Rugby, playing 11 times and scoring 2 tries.

The 2015 Super Rugby season would prove to be memorable both for Evans, who scored 3 tries in 14 appearances, and the Highlanders, who won their maiden Super Rugby title, defeating the  21-14 in the final.  Evans was named on the bench for the final as a replacement, taking part in the win.

The 2015 ITM Cup and 2016 Mitre 10 Cup seasons were largely a write-off for Evans. He broke his arm in the first Magpies game of the 2015 season - a successful Ranfurly Shield defence against  - and suffered a season-ending knee injury during the 2016 Super Rugby season.  These injuries restricted him to just a solitary appearance over the course of 2 years, which saw the Magpies promoted as ITM Cup Championship champions in 2015 before being relegated back to the Championship for the 2017 season after just a sole season in the top division.

Despite his injury problems over the previous 2 years, new Highlanders head-coach, Tony Brown, opted to retain Evans in his squad for his first season in charge in 2017.

The 2017 season proved more successful for Evans, as he played 15 games for the Highlanders, including a start against the touring British and Irish Lions side on 13 June 2017.  Evans played the full 80 minutes against the Lions, with the Highlanders narrowly winning 23-22 in the historic fixture.

2018–2021

On 28 July 2017, the  announced that the franchise had signed Evans on a 2-year deal from the 2018 Super Rugby season.

Evans has become a regular starter for the Hurricanes since his arrival at the franchise. He made his debut for the Hurricanes on 25 February 2018 against the Bulls in Pretoria and scored his first try for the franchise on 30 March 2018, a 30m solo try against the Rebels as the Hurricanes beat them 50-19.  Evans went on to start at openside flanker during the playoffs, with departing team-mate Blade Thomson returning from injury to take Evans' place at number 8. The Hurricanes were knocked out of the competition during the semi-finals, losing to the Crusaders 12-30.  Evans finished the season as one of the best-performing players in the Hurricanes and was subsequently praised by the media for his performances.

Evans captained the Magpies multiple times during the 2018 Mitre 10 Cup season, alongside experienced team-mate Brad Weber, with the regular Magpies captain, Ash Dixon, ruled out for the season with injury. As co-captains, Evans and Weber lead Hawke's Bay to the playoffs for the first time since 2015.

After his All Blacks debut on 3 November 2018, Evans stayed in Japan for a brief stint with Japanese club NTT DoCoMo Red Hurricanes for the remainder of their 2018 Top Challenge League season. He played four games for the club, including a promotion/relegation match against Coca-Cola Red Sparks, which resulted in a 33-24 win and promotion to the 2019–20 Top League for the Red Hurricanes.

2022–

On 1 November 2021, the  announced that Evans would return to Dunedin, where his professional career started, and join his brother Bryn at the franchise for the 2022 Super Rugby Pacific season.

International career

After a successful 2018 season, Evans was selected in the wider squad for the All Blacks' 2018 Northern Tour to Japan and Europe.  He made his international debut for New Zealand on 3 November 2018 against Japan. Evans replaced Patrick Tuipulotu in the 54th minute of the test and performed well, setting up a try for his former Highlanders team-mate Waisake Naholo. The All Blacks defeated Japan 69-31.

Career honours

Highlanders

Super Rugby - 2015

Hawke's Bay

ITM Cup Championship - 2015
Mitre 10 Cup Championship - 2020

References

External links
 
NZ Rugby History player profile

1991 births
Living people
New Zealand people of Zimbabwean descent
People educated at Napier Boys' High School
University of Otago alumni
New Zealand rugby union players
Rugby union flankers
New Zealand international rugby union players
Otago rugby union players
Highlanders (rugby union) players
Hawke's Bay rugby union players
Hurricanes (rugby union) players
Rugby union players from Hastings, New Zealand
Rugby union number eights
NTT DoCoMo Red Hurricanes Osaka players